Shah Amanat International Airport  ( Shah Amanôt Antôrjatik Bimanbôndôr) is an international airport serving Bangladesh's southeastern port city of Chittagong. Operated and maintained by the Civil Aviation Authority of Bangladesh, it is the second-largest international airport in Bangladesh after Shahjalal International Airport in Dhaka, Bangladesh. It is used by the Bangladesh Air Force as a part of 'BAF Zahurul Haq Base'. It was formerly known as MA Hannan International Airport, named after Awami League politician M. A. Hannan, but was renamed on 2 April 2005 by the Government of Bangladesh, after an 18th-century Islamic saint, Shah Amanat. It is capable of annually handling 1.5 million passengers and 6,000 tonnes of cargo. It also serves as a base for the Arirang Flying School.

Location
The airport is in the Patenga area of the city, 20 kilometres (13 mi; 11 NM) west from the city's main commercial hub, GEC Circle and 18.5 km south of the city's railway station on the north bank of the Karnaphuli River. There are a few hotels or restaurants near the airport; numerous hotels and restaurants are available in the city.

History

World War II

The airfield was built in the early 1940s under the British rule. Known as Chittagong Airfield during World War II, it was used as a supply point by the United States Army Air Forces' 4th Combat Cargo Group. From the airport, they flew C-46 Commando aircraft to transport men and supplies between January and June 1945, during the Burma Campaign 1944-1945. At the end of June, control of the airport was returned to local authorities.

Bangladeshi airport
It officially became a Bangladeshi airport in 1972 after the Bangladesh Liberation War. At first, it was mainly used for connecting Dhaka and Chittagong. But in the mid-1990s Biman started international flights to Bangkok, Dubai and all other major Gulf cities and it officially became an international airport.

Expansion since 1998
In March 1998, a major renovation and expansion began, which ended in December 2000. CAAB received financial assistance from the Japan International Cooperation Agency for the US$51.57 million upgrade. The project was carried out by Japanese firms Shimizu and Marubeni. The upgrade modernised the terminal with new and better seats, more check-in counters, better security equipment and other facilities. The Air Traffic Control tower received new hi-tech equipment such as 3D radar. The runway, taxiways and the tarmac were expanded and improved. After the upgrade, aircraft such as the Boeing 747-400 or the Airbus A340 can land easily.

In June 2005, CAAB announced that the management of the airport would be awarded to Thai Airways, the national carrier of Thailand, for 10 years. Thai Airways would be responsible of catering, passenger check-in, ground handling, cargo handling, and other technical services. This, however, never materialized.

Biman and US-Bangla Airlines currently operate flights to Dhaka and various points in the Middle East. Domestic destinations like Sylhet, Cox's Bazar and Jashore have also been added. Foreign airlines include Fly Dubai, Air Arabia, Jazeera Airways, Oman Air and Salam Air. Novo Air operates flights to Dhaka only. US-Bangla also operates flights to Chennai after originating in Dhaka.

Emirates SkyCargo launched cargo services in 2013, making it the first scheduled cargo airline in the airport.

Infrastructure and operation

Terminal

The airport's sole  passenger terminal is divided into two parts: International and Domestic with a boarding bridge in each. The International part of the terminal is larger than the Domestic one due to higher number of passengers. The building is divided into two floors: The lower floor is used for checking in, boarding or getting off small planes, and receiving luggage. The upper floor is used for boarding or getting off large planes only.

The airport also has a  cargo terminal. A new Lounge has also been created for American express card holders.

Control tower
The air traffic control tower is 50 meters west of the airport terminal. It has a clear view of the tarmac and taxiways but is far from the runway. Heavy rain or fog can make it difficult for controllers to see planes taking off or landing.

Runway
The largest aircraft that can land is a Boeing 747-400.

Taxiways and tarmac

The airport has two taxiways, Alpha and Bravo, that directly leads to the tarmac (or aircraft parking zone) from the runway. The tarmac can accommodate a maximum of four aircraft; two wide-body Boeing 747-400s, a wide-body McDonnell Douglas DC-10 and a narrow-body Airbus A320 can be parked there at once.

The airport has two boarding bridges and two passenger steps. The parking points are usually empty as most of the planes that arrive there take off soon after; the planes of local airlines are generally parked at Shahjalal International Airport overnight. A small civil plane hangar belonging to Biman is available but is rarely used.

The Bangladesh Military has a parking zone and two plane hangars east of the runway. The Bangladesh Air Force store a few planes here which have direct access to the runway.

Airlines and destinations

Passenger

Cargo

Ground transportation
Shah Amanat International Airport can be easily accessed by car or taxi thorough the city's Agrabad and GEC area. It has three parking zones: one civil and two VIP. The civil one is in front of the terminal; it has a capacity of 400 cars. This zone is usually loaded with public transport, mostly auto-rickshaws and micro-buses. The zone is made of concrete and asphalt, surrounded by a grass patch. Both VIP parking zones are beside the terminal, one left and one right. The one on the left is for people who work at the airport or one of the airlines, such as pilots or air traffic controllers. The other is used by the VVIPs.

Incidents and accidents
 1 July 2005: Biman flight BG 048 en route from Dubai skidded off runway 23 onto the grass while landing during heavy rain. The right-hand undercarriage of the McDonnell Douglas DC-10-30 caught fire. Ten passengers were injured while exiting. Investigations found that the wheel-box of the aircraft went out of order. The aircraft was later written-off.
 3 August 2017: A Bangladesh Navy Dornier 228 aircraft on a routine training exercise veered off runway 23 after landing. No crew members were injured during the incident. The airport was closed for about 3 hours; a Cessna 152 training aircraft landed safely on the opposite runway few minutes after the incident.
 26 September 2018: A US-Bangla Airlines Boeing 737NG aircraft bound for Cox's Bazar from Dhaka was forced to make an emergency landing when the pilots had difficulty in trying to lower the nose-gear. The aircraft carrying 171 passengers and crew, made an emergency landing at Chittagong, Shah Amanat International Airport at 1:45 pm local time. No injuries and fatalities occurred as the flight crew, was able to evacuate the entire plane as emergency services rushed to the scene.
On 25 February 2019, a Biman Bangladesh Airlines Flight 147 was subject to attempted hijacking. The Boeing 737-800, bound for Dubai via Chittagong, was carrying 143 passengers and seven crew members. The plane made an emergency landing at 5:41pm. The alleged hijacker was killed in a commando operation at Shah Amanat International Airport after all passengers were evacuated safely. It has emerged that the hijacker was mentally deranged and wanted to speak to his estranged ex-wife during the saga.

References

External links

 Civil Aviation Authority of Bangladesh: Airports
 Live Flight Status

International airports in Bangladesh
Transport in Chittagong
Airfields of the United States Army Air Forces in British India
Airfields of the United States Army Air Forces Air Transport Command in the China-Burma-India Theater
World War II sites in India